Callistege diagonalis  is a moth of the family Erebidae. It is found in North America, including Arizona and New Mexico.

The wingspan is about 28 mm.

References

External links

Moths described in 1898
Callistege